Hillcrest is an unincorporated community in Douglas County, Illinois, United States. Hillcrest is located immediately to the south of Tuscola.

References 

Unincorporated communities in Douglas County, Illinois
Unincorporated communities in Illinois